The Museo delle Scienze (MUSE) is a science museum in Trento, Italy. The museum was designed by architect Renzo Piano and opened in 2013.

References

Science museums in Italy